Red Harvest is a 1929 detective novel by Dashiell Hammett.

Red Harvest may also refer to:

Red Harvest (band), a Norwegian industrial metal band
Red Harvest (Bloodsimple album), 2007
Red Harvest (Altar album)
Red Harvest (play), a 1937 Broadway play by Walter Charles Roberts